The International Skydiving Museum & Hall of Fame is a 501(c)(3) not-for-profit corporation governed by a Board of Trustees. Equipment and documents are being collected, inventoried, and preserved. Funds are being raised to build the museum in Central Florida.

Functions
The purpose of the International Skydiving Museum & Hall of Fame is to recognize and promote the sport of skydiving and the parachute industry through public education and awareness; recognize the contribution to skydiving by its participants, suppliers, and supporters; capture forever the history of the sport and the industry via its events, equipment, and personalities; and enhance aviation safety as it pertains to skydiving.

References

External links
 
 United States Parachute Association
 Parachute Industry Association 
 Parachutist magazine

Sports museums in Virginia
Parachuting in the United States
Parachuting organizations
Museums in Fredericksburg, Virginia
Non-profit organizations based in Fredericksburg, Virginia